Maimonachaetetes is a thalloid red alga of uncertain placement.

References

Fossil algae
Carboniferous life